is a Shinto shrine in Hidaka, Takaoka District, Kōchi Prefecture, Japan.

The shrine was founded in 587, but the present main building (shaden) of the shrine dates to 1705. The  Japanese cedar behind the main building is considered sacred and said to be 1000 years old. It has been designated by the village as natural monument (村指定天然記念物). According to legend, the tree top is said to shine at times of emergency. Because of this, the tree is also called .

The object of worship or shintai of the shrine is a sword, the National Treasure . Offered to Kunitokotachi by the Kusakabe clan at the time of foundation, this double-edged blade is said to be the oldest Japanese object transmitted from generation to generation. The tachi is on public display at the shrine's yearly grand festival on November 15.

Two late Heian period wooden masks of Boddhisattvas designated as Important Cultural Properties and two mirrors featuring a Hōrai design designated as prefectural tangible cultural properties are in possession of the shrine. Other notable treasures held by the shrine include a piece of Sue ware, two bronze hoko, a vertical picture attributed to Ono no Michikaze, a munafuda (棟札) ridge tag with information on the building's construction from 1240, nine painted wooden hengaku votive plaques of the 36 poets and a tanzaku (narrow strip of paper) with waka by Emperor Go-Nara.

Omura-Jinja-Mae Station on the Dosan Line was opened in 2008 and is named after Omura Shrine.

See also
List of National Treasures of Japan (crafts: swords)

References

Bibliography

Shinto shrines in Kōchi Prefecture